
Gmina Prusice is an urban-rural gmina (administrative district) in Trzebnica County, Lower Silesian Voivodeship, in south-western Poland. It is part of the Wrocław metropolitan area.

Neighbouring gminas
Gmina Prusice is bordered by the gminas of Oborniki Śląskie, Trzebnica, Wińsko, Wołów and Żmigród.

Villages
Apart from the town of Prusice, the gmina contains the villages of Borów, Borówek, Brzeźno, Budzicz, Chodlewko, Dębnica, Gola, Górowo, Jagoszyce, Kaszyce Wielkie, Kopaszyn, Kosinowo, Krościna Mała, Krościna Wielka, Ligota Strupińska, Ligotka, Pawłów Trzebnicki, Pększyn, Pietrowice Małe, Piotrkowice, Raszowice, Skokowa, Strupina, Świerzów, Wilkowa and Wszemirów.

Twin towns – sister cities

Gmina Prusice is twinned with:
 Laudenbach, Germany
 Myrnohrad, Ukraine
 Prusice, Czech Republic

References

Prusice
Trzebnica County